Svengali is a live album by jazz composer, arranger, conductor and pianist Gil Evans, recorded in 1973 by Evans with an orchestra featuring Ted Dunbar, Howard Johnson,  David Sanborn, Billy Harper, Richard Williams, Trevor Koehler, and Hannibal Marvin Peterson. The name of the album is an anagram for Gil Evans.

Reception
The Allmusic review by Scott Yanow awarded the album 4½ stars stating "one of Gil Evans's finest recordings of the 1970s. He expertly blended together acoustic and electronic instruments... Evans's arrangements are quite inventive and innovative. Rarely would he be so successful in balancing written and improvised sections in his later years".

Track listing
All compositions arranged and conducted by Gil Evans.
"Thoroughbred" (Billy Harper) - 6:33
"Blues In Orbit" (George Russell) - 10:15
"Eleven" (Miles Davis, Gil Evans) - 1:42
"Cry of Hunger" (Harper) - 10:18
"Summertime" (George Gershwin, Ira Gershwin, DuBose Heyward) - 3:58
"Zee Zee" (Evans) - 7:37
Recorded live in 1973 at Trinity Church, New York, NY except "Zee Zee" which was recorded at Philharmonic Hall, New York, NY.

Personnel
Gil Evans - Piano, Electric piano
David Sanborn - Alto saxophone
Billy Harper - Tenor saxophone
Trevor Koehler - Baritone saxophone, Soprano saxophone, Flute
Richard Williams - Trumpet
Tex Allen - Trumpet (except on "Zee Zee")
Marvin Peterson - Trumpet (on "Zee Zee")
Sharon Freeman - French horn
Pete Levin - French horn
Joseph Daley - Trombone, Tuba
Howard Johnson - Tuba, Baritone saxophone, Flugelhorn
David Horowitz - synthesizers
Ted Dunbar - Guitar
Herb Bushler - Electric bass
Bruce Ditmas - drums
Sue Evans - Percussion

References 

1973 live albums
Gil Evans live albums
Albums arranged by Gil Evans
Atlantic Records live albums